Dysommina rugosa is an eel in the family Synaphobranchidae (cutthroat eels). It was described by Isaac Ginsburg in 1951. It is a marine, deep water-dwelling eel which is known from the western Atlantic and eastern central Pacific Ocean. It dwells at a depth range of 260–775 metres, and is found off the continental slope. Males can reach a maximum total length of 37 centimetres.

Description
The snout is fleshy with a number of papillae and tapers towards the front, overhanging the lower jaw. There are two pairs of nostrils, one pair at the tip of the snout and the other pair between the eyes, which are large and circular and covered with skin. There are no premaxillary teeth and the maxillary and dentary teeth are tiny and arranged in a number of irregular rows. The roof of the mouth has four large, compound vomerine teeth. The gill openings are crescent-shaped and about the same size as the eyes. The origin of the dorsal fin is further back than the origin of the pectoral fins. The dorsal and anal fins are confluent with the small caudal fin. The ventral surface of this fish is darker than the head and dorsal surface, and the pectoral, dorsal and anal fins are pale with yellowish-white edges.

Distribution and habitat
The species occurs in the tropical western Atlantic Ocean, the Caribbean Sea and Gulf of Mexico as well as the eastern and central Pacific Ocean and Hawaii.

Eel City
This area had pillow lava flows draped with yellowish microbial mats, and whenever the submersible touched down, previously hidden eels, since identified as Dysommina rugosa, swarmed into the water column. It is thought that the eels hide in crevices in the yellow mats for their own protection and feed on planktonic crustaceans drifting past.

References

Synaphobranchidae
Taxa named by Isaac Ginsburg
Fish described in 1951